Taiyuan Wusu International Airport   is an airport serving Taiyuan, the capital of Shanxi province, China.

Built in 1939, it has evolved into one of the busiest and most important airports of Shanxi Province, with connections to most major cities within China. Since March 2006, the airport has undergone an expansion phase with a new terminal at a cost of CNY 1.57 billion, and is capable of serving 6 million passengers a year. Construction was completed in late 2007. Since this expansion, it has been able to serve as a diversionary airport for Beijing Capital International Airport, and notably performed that function during the 2008 Beijing Olympics.

The airport is a focus city for both China Eastern Airlines and Hainan Airlines. As of 2020, Taiyuan Wuxu International Airport was the 30th busiest airport in the People's Republic of China, with 9,013,205 passengers.

Airlines and destinations

See also
List of airports in China
China's busiest airports by passenger traffic

References

External links
 Taiyuan Wuxu International Airport

Airports in Shanxi
Airports established in 1939
1939 establishments in China